Grant Gillespie may refer to:
 Grant Gillespie (footballer) (born 1991), Scottish footballer
 Grant Gillespie (writer), English novelist and actor